Denis O'Shea (April 1932 – 22 June 2010) was an Irish Gaelic footballer who played for club sides Camp and Kerins O'Rahilly's and at inter-county level with the Kerry senior football team.

Career

O'Shea first played Gaelic football at club level with Camp before transferring to the Kerins O'Rahilly's, with whom he won three Kerry Senior Football Championship titles between 1953 and 1957. He first appeared on the inter-county scene with the Kerry junior team in 1955 before immediately being drafted onto the senior team. O'Shea won the first of two provincial championship medals that year before ending the season with an All-Ireland title after lining out at midfield in the defeat of Dublin in the 1955 All-Ireland final. He ended his career by claiming a National League title in 1959.

Honours

Kerins O'Rahilly's
Kerry Senior Football Championship: 1953, 1954, 1957

Kerry
All-Ireland Senior Football Championship: 1955
Leinster Senior Football Championship: 1955, 1958
National Football League: 1958-59

References

External links
Dinny O'Shea profile at the Terrace Talk website

1932 births
2010 deaths
Bus drivers
Kerins O'Rahilly's Gaelic footballers
Kerry inter-county Gaelic footballers